Just Another Romantic Wrestling Comedy is a 2006 film starring April Hunter and Joanie Laurer. This romantic comedy was premiered at New Jersey and New York City on December 1, 2006 and was released on DVD in the United States and the United Kingdom on April 17, 2007. After the film's DVD release Just Another Romantic Wrestling Comedy won an Honorable Mention award at the New Jersey International Festival awards. The release was handled by Victory Multimedia.

Plot
The film is about a Jewish man named Marty Shalom Weinstein (Fiore) who falls in love with a wrestling princess Sandy and it's a "no holds barred" quest for her love, the Jewish man finds he has to fight for his love as Sandy's dad is also a wrestler who only wants his daughter to marry a famous wrestler, and not a Jewish man with little money and no muscles. Robert also has to deal with Roxanne (Laurer) and Jennie (Marshall) along with others out to get him.

Cast
Selassie Amana - Robert John
Joanie Laurer - Roxanne
April Hunter - Diamond Piedra
Nicole Brier - Sandy Piedra
Don Frye - Rocco Piedra
Aaron Fiore - Marty Shalom Weinstein
Renoly Santiago - Scorpio
Sal Vulcano - Pinky
Russ Newman - Broadcaster Russ

Reception
Critical reception for the movie was negative, with the only review on Rotten Tomatoes calling it "Just another bad movie." Wrestling reviewer Brian Zane called the film "without a doubt the absolute worst movie I have ever seen. Ever".

References

External links
 
 
 FilmSpot - Cast & DVD Details

2006 films
2006 romantic comedy films
2000s sports comedy films
Sport wrestling films
American romantic comedy films
2000s English-language films
2000s American films